The U.S. Senate Agriculture Subcommittee on Food and Nutrition, Specialty Crops, Organics, and Research is one of five subcommittees of the U.S. Senate Committee on Agriculture, Nutrition and Forestry.

Name changes
The subcommittee was renamed for the 115th United States Congress (2017).

It was previously:
115th-116th Congresses: Nutrition, Agricultural Research, and Specialty Crops
112th-114th Congresses: Subcommittee on Nutrition, Specialty Crops, Food and Agricultural Research
Prior to 112th Congress: Subcommittee on Nutrition and Hunger, Nutrition and Family Farms.

Jurisdiction
This subcommittee has jurisdiction over "domestic and international nutrition and food assistance and hunger prevention; school and child nutrition programs; local and healthy food initiatives; futures, options and derivatives; pesticides; and general legislation".  The origins of the subcommittee lay in the Senate Select Committee on Nutrition and Human Needs that was active from 1968 to 1977 before being subsumed into the Agriculture Committee.

Members

118th Congress

References

External links
Subcommittee webpage

Agriculture Nutrition
Senate Agriculture Subcommittee on Hunger, Nutrition and Family Farms